Poringland is a village in the district of South Norfolk, England. Its population has rapidly grown in the past 50 years.

Poringland was previously also known as both East Poringland and Great Poringland, and was part of the ancient Hundred of Henstead. The place-name 'Poringland' is first attested in the Domesday Book of 1086, where it appears as 'Porringhelanda', the meaning of which is uncertain. Some believe the name derives from 'Poor spring land', because it has poor soil, containing much clay.

This village contains many public services. These include two pubs, a supermarket, estate agents, takeaways, a restaurant and various shops.

The church of Poringland All Saints is one of 124 existing round-tower churches in Norfolk.

The village sign, which stands close to the church and the village pond, depicts the artist John Crome, founder of the Norwich School of artists, working on his famous painting 'The Poringland Oak'. Cromes Oak Close in the village is named after the artist. Many of Crome's paintings are available to view at the Norwich Castle Museum. The original of the Poringland Oak hangs in Room 7 at Tate Britain.

The village of Framingham Earl which borders Poringland, contains the local High School. The River Chet (Norfolk) rises in Poringland.

The German writer W.G. Sebald lived in Poringland until his death in a car crash in 2001. A former Norwich City and Scotland international footballer Robert Fleck also lived in Poringland. Ronan Parke, runner-up of Britain's Got Talent in 2011, also resides in the village. As does former Norwich City and Everton manager, Mike Walker.

Governance
Poringland is part of the electoral ward called Poringland with the Framinghams. The population as of the 2011 census was 4,826.

References

External links

All Saints on the European Round Tower Churches website
Poringland Primary School
Poringland Parish Council

Villages in Norfolk
Civil parishes in Norfolk